Directorate of Technical Education and Training (DTET) is an education and training body in the state of Odisha. It is an autonomous institution of the State Government of Odisha. It is affiliated with the Directorate General of Employment and Training (DGET), All India Council for Technical Education (AICTE), and State Council for Technical Education & Vocational Training (SCTE & VT).

DTET had its campus at Killa Maidan, Buxi Bazar, Cuttack. The current director is Reghu G., IAS.

Since 1977, DTET shared its admission procedure and syllabus for various diploma courses and industrial training in various engineering and non-engineering trades in the state with DGET, AICTE, and SCTE & VT.

References

External links
 dtetorissa.gov.in Official Website.
 SCTE & VT Orissa
 DGET Gov. Of India

Autonomous Colleges of Odisha
State Council for Technical Education & Vocational Training
Educational institutions established in 1977
All India Council for Technical Education
Engineering colleges in Odisha
Universities and colleges in Odisha
State agencies of Odisha
1977 establishments in Orissa